Thermodiaptomus is a genus of copepods in the family Diaptomidae, containing the following species:
Thermodiaptomus congruens (G. O. Sars, 1927)
Thermodiaptomus galebi (Barrois, 1891)
Thermodiaptomus galeboides (G. O. Sars, 1909)
Thermodiaptomus mixtus (G. O. Sars, 1909)
Thermodiaptomus syngenes (Kiefer, 1929)
Thermodiaptomus yabensis (S. Wright & Tressler, 1928)

T. galeboides is restricted to Lake Victoria, and is listed as a vulnerable species on the IUCN Red List.

References

Diaptomidae
Taxonomy articles created by Polbot